Zapata's Gang (German:Zapatas Bande) is a 1914 German silent film directed by Urban Gad and starring Asta Nielsen.

Cast
 Asta Nielsen 
 Fred Immler 
 Senta Eichstaedt
 Adele Reuter-Eichberg 
 Mary Scheller 
 Hans Lanser-Rudolf 
 Carl Dibbern 
 Max Agerty 
 Ernst Körner 
 Eric Harden
 Max Landa

References

Bibliography
 Jennifer M. Kapczynski & Michael D. Richardson. A New History of German Cinema.

External links

1914 films
1914 comedy films
German comedy films
Films of the German Empire
Films directed by Urban Gad
German silent short films
Films set in Italy
Cross-dressing in film
Films about filmmaking
German black-and-white films
Silent comedy films
1910s German films
1910s German-language films